The 1993 International Austrian Indoor Championships was a women's tennis tournament played on indoor carpet courts at the Intersport Arena in Linz, Austria that was part of Tier III of the 1993 WTA Tour. It was the seventh edition of the tournament and was held from 22 February through 28 February 1993. Second-seeded Manuela Maleeva-Fragniere won the singles title, her second at the event after 1991, and earned $27,000 first-prize money as well as 190 ranking points.

Finals

Singles
 Manuela Maleeva-Fragniere defeated  Conchita Martínez 6–2, 1–0 ret
 It was Maleeva-Fragniere' 1st singles title of the year and the 17th of her career.

Doubles
 Eugenia Maniokova /  Leila Meskhi defeated  Conchita Martínez /  Judith Wiesner w/o
 It was Maniokova's 1st doubles title of the year and the 3rd of her career. It was Meskhi's only doubles title of the year and the 8th of her career.

References

External links
 WTA tournament edition details
 ITF tournament edition details

EA-Generali Ladies Linz
Linz Open
EA-Generali Ladies Linz
EA-Generali Ladies Linz
Generali